The Mongoose-V 32-bit microprocessor for spacecraft onboard computer applications is a radiation-hardened and expanded 10–15 MHz version of the MIPS R3000 CPU. Mongoose-V was developed by Synova of Melbourne, Florida, USA, with support from the NASA Goddard Space Flight Center.

The Mongoose-V processor first flew on NASA's Earth Observing-1 (EO-1) satellite launched in November 2000 where it functioned as the main flight computer. A second Mongoose-V controlled the satellite's solid-state data recorder.

The Mongoose-V requires 5 volts and is packaged into a 256-pin ceramic quad flatpack (CQFP).

Examples of spacecraft that use the Mongoose-V include:
 Earth Observing-1 (EO-1)
 NASA's Microwave Anisotropy Probe (MAP), launched in June 2001, carried a Mongoose-V flight computer similar to that on EO-1. 
 NASA's Space Technology 5 series of microsatellites
 CONTOUR
 TIMED
 Pluto probe New Horizons

See also

 RAD750 Power PC
 LEON
 ERC32
 Radiation hardening
 Communications survivability
 Faraday cage
 Institute for Space and Defense Electronics, Vanderbilt University
 Mars Reconnaissance Orbiter
 MESSENGER Mercury probe
 Mars rovers
 TEMPEST

References

External links
 Mongoose-V product page at Synova's website

Avionics computers
MIPS implementations
Radiation-hardened microprocessors
New Horizons